Hotel Rosita is a historic hotel in Puerto Vallarta, in the Mexican state of Jalisco. The 115-room hotel is among the city's oldest, built in 1948. According to Fodor's, "It's still a viable budget option, mainly recommended for its location on the north end of the malecón close to restaurants and shops. Rooms are very basic; expect white-tile floors and fabrics with floral prints. The cheapest quarters have no air-conditioning."

References

External links
 

1948 establishments in Mexico
Buildings and structures in Puerto Vallarta
Hotel buildings completed in 1948
Hotels in Mexico